Hà Tiên was a former province of South Vietnam originally formed in 1832 and disestablished in 1956. Its capital was Hà Tiên.

History
Hà Tiên province had been a part of Cambodia for a long time. In Khmer, the province was called Peam, which meant "port". In 18 century, a small town "Hà Tiên" was established by a Cambodian governor, Mo Jiu (Mạc Cửu), whom was a Chinese emigrant.

Many works incorrectly referred to Hà Tiên as "Panthaimas", confusing Hà Tiên with Banteay Meas. It was variously spelled as Panday-mas (Khmer), Ponteamass (English), Phutthaimat or Banthaimat, Ponthiamas or Pontheaymas (French), Pontiano (Robert's Map, 1751), Panthai-mas, Bantaimas, Pontiamas, Pontaimas, Bantay-mas, Banteay M’eas, Pontiamas, Pontiamasse, Po-taimat, and infinite other variations.

Mạc Cửu later switched allegiance to the Nguyễn lords of Vietnam. Since 1708, Peam became Vietnamese Hà Tiên trấn, however, Hà Tiên trấn enjoyed a high degree of autonomy until 1777. Former governors of Hà Tiên trấn include Mạc Cửu, Mạc Thiên Tứ, Trần Liên and Mạc Tử Sinh.

Hà Tiên trấn was disestablished and changed to Hà Tiên province in 1832. It was one of Six Provinces of Southern Vietnam. After the Cochinchina Campaign it was ceded to France and later became a part of French Cochinchina. On 1 January 1900, Hà Tiên province was divided into the 3 provinces: Hà Tiên, Rạch Giá, Bạc Liêu. In 1901, Hà Tiên province contained two prefectures (phủ), including An Biên and Quảng Biên.

In 1950, Hà Tiên province and Long Châu Hậu province were merged into the new established Long Châu Hà Province. In 1954, Long Châu Hà province was disestablished and divided into three provinces: Hà Tiên, Châu Đốc, Long Xuyên.

On 22 October 1956, Hà Tiên province and Rạch Giá province merged to Kiên Giang province. The former Hà Tiên province divided into two districts, Hà Tiên and Phú Quốc, both were parts of Kiên Giang Province.

References

Former provinces of Vietnam
States and territories established in 1832
Southeast (Vietnam)